Order of St. Anne may refer to:
 Order of St. Anne (Anglican) (OSA), an Anglican religious order
 Order of St. Anne (Chicago), the OSA's Chicago convent
 Order of St. Anna, Russian Imperial order of chivalry established by Karl Friedrich, Duke of Holstein-Gottorp on 14 February 1735